Euzophera habrella is a species of snout moth in the genus Euzophera. It was described by Herbert H. Neunzig in 1990 and is known from North America, including British Columbia, Quebec, Ontario, Maryland, Tennessee, Virginia and West Virginia.

References

Moths described in 1990
Phycitini
Moths of North America